Walt Disney Imagineering Blue Sky Cellar opened October 20, 2008 replacing the Seasons of the Vine Theater at Disney California Adventure at the Disneyland Resort in Anaheim, California. It closed on September 29, 2013, and reopened on April 13, 2018, to provide a preview of Pixar Pier.

The exhibit is a preview center intended to promote upcoming attractions coming to the park, such as the dark ride The Little Mermaid: Ariel's Undersea Adventure, Goofy's Sky School roller coaster, Buena Vista Street and the Cars Land themed areas. The exhibit often shows a preview film that features Imagineers talking about the upcoming attractions, which is updated routinely as construction progresses.

Exhibits
Exhibits for the following lands and attractions have been featured in Blue Sky Cellar:
Mickey's Fun Wheel - Opened May 4, 2009
Silly Symphony Swings - Opened June 11, 2010
World of Color - Opened June 11, 2010
The Little Mermaid: Ariel's Undersea Adventure - Opened June 3, 2011
Goofy's Sky School - Opened July 1, 2011
Buena Vista Street/Cars Land - June 15, 2012
 Fantasy Faire - Opened March 12, 2013
 Mickey & the Magical Map - Opened May 25, 2013
 Market House (Starbucks Conversion) - Opened September 29, 2013
Pixar Pier - Blue Sky Cellar exhibition opened April 13, 2018

See also
The EPCOT Experience Center, a preview center at EPCOT

References

Amusement park attractions introduced in 2008
Disney California Adventure
Walt Disney Parks and Resorts attractions
Pacific Wharf (Disney California Adventure)
2008 establishments in California